The Women of Color Policy Network is a policy research entity funded by the Ford Foundation, New York Community Trust and the Robert F. Wagner Graduate School of Public Service.  The Women of Color Policy Network provides data to community-based groups about the impact of policy on women of color in areas of health, economics, employment etc.  The network also mentors young women of color to enter fields such as policy and advocacy.
The Women of Color Policy Network at the Robert F. Wagner Graduate School of Public Service closed on March 24, 2013.

External links
Women of Color Policy Network website

African-American organizations
Non-profit organizations based in New York City
Organizations established in 2000
African-American women's organizations
History of women in New York City
Organizations for women of color